In the polytonic orthography of Ancient Greek, the  rough breathing ( or  daseîa) character is a diacritical mark used to indicate the presence of an  sound before a vowel, diphthong, or after rho. It remained in the polytonic orthography even after the Hellenistic period, when the sound disappeared from the Greek language. In the monotonic orthography of Modern Greek phonology, in use since 1982, it is not used at all.

The absence of an  sound is marked by the smooth breathing.

Herbert Giles and others have used a left (opening) curved single quotation mark for the same purpose; the apostrophe, backtick, and visually similar characters are often seen as well.

History

Usage
The rough breathing ( ̔ ) is placed over an initial vowel, or over the second vowel of an initial diphthong.
  haíresis 'choice' (→ Latin haeresis → English heresy)
  hḗrōs 'hero'

An upsilon or rho at the beginning of a word always takes a rough breathing.
  hýmnos 'hymn'
  rhythmós 'rhythm'

Inside a word
In some writing conventions, the rough breathing is written on the second of two rhos in the middle of a word. This is transliterated as rrh in Latin.
  diárrhoia 'diarrhoea'

In crasis (contraction of two words), when the second word has a rough breathing, the contracted vowel does not take a rough breathing. Instead, the consonant before the contracted vowel changes to the aspirated equivalent (i.e., π → φ, τ → θ, κ → χ), if possible, and the contracted vowel takes the apostrophe or coronis (identical to the smooth breathing). 
  'the other one'
tò héteron → thoúteron

In the ancient Laconian dialect, medial intervocalic  would become a rough breathing:  for Attic .

Technical notes
It is intended to be used in all alphabetic scripts (including Greek and Latin).

Basically, U+1FFE was encoded for full roundtrip compatibility with legacy 8-bit encodings of the Greek script in documents where dasia was encoded before the Greek capital letter it modifies (it is then not appropriate for transliterating Armenian and Semitic scripts to the Latin script).

There is a polytonic Greek code range in Unicode, covering precomposite versions (breathing mark + vowel etc.): Ἁ ἁ, Ἇ ἇ, ᾏ ᾇ, ᾉ ᾁ, Ἑ ἑ, Ἡ ἡ, Ἧ ἧ, ᾟ ᾗ, ᾙ ᾑ, Ἱ ἱ, Ἷ ἷ, Ὁ ὁ, Ῥ ῥ, Ὑ ὑ, Ὗ ὗ, Ὡ ὡ, Ὧ ὧ, ᾯ ᾧ, and ᾩ ᾡ.

The rough breathing was also used in the early Cyrillic alphabet when writing the Old Church Slavonic language. In this context it is encoded as Unicode 

In Latin transcription of Semitic languages, especially Arabic and Hebrew, either  or a symbol similar to it, is used to represent the letter ayin. This left half ring may also be used for the Latin transcription of Armenian (though the Armenian aspiration is phonetically nearer to the Greek dasia than the Semitic ayin).

See also
 Greek diacritics
 Smooth breathing
 Ayin ( ʿ )

References

Greek-script diacritics
Cyrillic-script diacritics
Ancient Greek